The fourth generation (Generation IV) of the Pokémon franchise features 107 fictional species of creatures introduced to the core video game series in the 2006 Nintendo DS games Pokémon Diamond and Pearl. Some Pokémon in this generation were introduced in animated adaptations of the franchise before Diamond and Pearl, such as Bonsly, Mime Jr. and Munchlax, which were recurring characters in the Pokémon anime series in 2005 and 2006.

The following list details the 107 Pokémon of Generation IV in order of their National Pokédex number. The first Pokémon, Turtwig, is number 387 and the last, Arceus, is number 493. Alternate forms that result in type changes are included for convenience. Mega evolutions and regional forms are included on the pages for the generation in which they were introduced.

List of Pokémon

 Turtwig
 Grotle
 Torterra
 Chimchar
 Monferno
 Infernape
 Piplup
 Prinplup
 Empoleon
 Starly
 Staravia
 Staraptor
 Bidoof
 Bibarel
 Kricketot
 Kricketune
 Shinx
 Luxio
 Luxray
 Budew
 Roserade
 Cranidos
 Rampardos
 Shieldon
 Bastiodon
 Burmy
 Wormadam
 Mothim
 Combee
 Vespiquen
 Pachirisu
 Buizel
 Floatzel
 Cherubi
 Cherrim
 Shellos
 Gastrodon
 Ambipom
 Drifloon
 Drifblim
 Buneary
 Lopunny
 Mismagius
 Honchkrow
 Glameow
 Purugly
 Chingling
 Stunky
 Skuntank
 Bronzor
 Bronzong
 Bonsly
 Mime Jr.
 Happiny
 Chatot
 Spiritomb
 Gible
 Gabite
 Garchomp
 Munchlax
 Riolu
 Lucario
 Hippopotas
 Hippowdon
 Skorupi
 Drapion
 Croagunk
 Toxicroak
 Carnivine
 Finneon
 Lumineon
 Mantyke
 Snover
 Abomasnow
 Weavile
 Magnezone
 Lickilicky
 Rhyperior
 Tangrowth
 Electivire
 Magmortar
 Togekiss
 Yanmega
 Leafeon
 Glaceon
 Gliscor
 Mamoswine
 Porygon-Z
 Gallade
 Probopass
 Dusknoir
 Froslass
 Rotom
 Uxie
 Mesprit
 Azelf
 Dialga
 Palkia
 Heatran
 Regigigas
 Giratina
 Cresselia
 Phione
 Manaphy
 Darkrai
 Shaymin
 Arceus

Notes

References

Lists of Pokémon
Video game characters introduced in 2006